Karl Aasland (13 November 1918 – 29 March 1982) was a Norwegian politician for the Centre Party.

Aasland was born in Time, Norway.

He was elected to the Norwegian Parliament from Rogaland in 1969, and was re-elected on one occasion.

On the local level he was a member of Gjestal municipality council from 1959 to 1961 and of Stavanger city council from 1965 to 1967.

Outside politics he worked as a dairy director from 1947 to 1982.

References

External links

1918 births
1982 deaths
People from Time, Norway
Members of the Storting
Centre Party (Norway) politicians
Rogaland politicians
Politicians from Stavanger
20th-century Norwegian politicians